Anshuman Mohanty (born November 7, 1983), is a politician, engineer, entrepreneur and former information technician. In 2014 he was elected MLA (Member of the Legislative Assembly (India)) from Rajanagar (Odisha Vidhan Sabha constituency) Odisha.

Personal life
Anshuman is the son of deceased cabinet Minister  Nalini Kanta Mohanty.

He received a Bachelor of Technology in Electronic Engineering from the Institute of Technical Education & Research under Utkal University in 2005.

He then worked in the Information Technology field before entering politics.

Politics

He won his first election in the State Assembly Elections in 2014, where he avenged his father's 2009 defeat.

See also

Election Reference
Candidature Announced

References

Living people
Members of the Odisha Legislative Assembly
Place of birth missing (living people)
1982 births